The 1929 All-Southwest Conference football team consists of American football players chosen by various organizations for All-Southwest Conference teams for the 1929 college football season.  The selectors for the 1929 season included the Associated Press (AP).

All Southwest selections

Backs
 Howard Grubbs, TCU (AP-1 [QB])
 Leland, TCU (AP-1 [HB])
 Wilson, Baylor (AP-1 [HB])
 Shelley, Texas (AP-1 [FB])

Ends
 Rose, Texas (AP-1)
 Wear Schoonover, Arkansas (AP-1)

Tackles
 Marion Hammon, SMU (AP-1)
 Mike Brumbelow, TCU (AP-1)

Guards
 Barton Koch, Baylor (AP-1)
 Choc Sanders, SMU (AP-1)

Centers
 Noble Atkins, TCU (AP-1)

Key
AP = Associated Press

See also
 1929 College Football All-America Team

References

All-Southwest Conference
All-Southwest Conference football teams